Guise castle is a medieval fortification in the town of Guise ([ɡɥiz]), in northern France. Originally an early medieval wooden motte and bailey castle, it was rebuilt in stone and then massively expanded during the 12th-16th centuries. It was remodelled by Marquis de Vauban in the late 17th century to meet the advances in sIege technology then taking place. Much of the castle was reduced to rubble during the First World War and, from 1952 onwards, it has been undergoing restoration by the Club du Vieux Manoir. Nowadays it is a popular tourist site.

Location 
The town of Guise and its fortress is on high ground on the west bank of the river Oise, in the Aisne département, in France's most northern region.

History 
It is at the medieval castle, first built with timbers in the 10th century and later in the 12th century rebuilt with the local stones. The castle is dominated by the keep. In the 16th century the dukes of Guise allowed the construction of one of Northern Europe's biggest bastions, which would later attract the attention of Vauban. After the shellfire during the First World War, the castle could have disappeared as a waste disposal site.

Sources 
Les Amis du Château Fort de Guise, Château Fort de Guise, Editions Ouest-France, 2014.

Further reading

External links 
 (in French) Club du Vieux Manoir

 

Fortified French châteaux
Aisne
Picardy